There have been 25 recorded Newfoundland hurricanes, or Atlantic Ocean hurricanes that have made a direct landfall as a tropical or subtropical cyclone on the island of Newfoundland since official records began in 1851. Significant hurricanes such as the 1775 Newfoundland hurricane are also included on this list, even though they occurred prior to the start of official record-keeping.

Note: Hurricanes that made landfall in Newfoundland as a post-tropical cyclone (such as Hurricane Michael in 2000) are excluded from this list.

See also

 List of Canada hurricanes
 List of Atlantic hurricanes

Notes

References

 Newfoundland
Lists of tropical cyclones by area